Geneviève Cadieux  (born 17 July 1955) is a Canadian artist known for her large-scale photographic and media works in urban settings. She lives in Montreal.

Education
Cadieux was born in Montreal, Quebec in 1955. She received her BA in Visual Arts from University of Ottawa.

Teaching
 Concordia University, 1991 – present;
 Guest professor, École nationale supérieure des Beaux-Arts in Paris, 1994;
 École nationale des beaux-arts in Grenoble, 1996

Works
Geneviève Cadieux is a photographer who frequently works with audio-visual materials in her large-scale public installations in urban settings. Cadieux's work confronts identity, gender, and the body. She presents the body as a landscape, focusing on small details close-up, such as mouths, bruises, and scars.

Cadieux's early career was mainly in film photography. Her 1989 work, Hear Me With Your Eyes, was featured at the Morris and Helen Belkin Art Gallery and consisted of large-scale photographic prints of a woman displaying sexually evocative facial expressions.

Over time, Cadieux's work has shifted to integrating video and audio content, such as her Broken Memory. The piece employed glass sculpture representative of the human body and a recorded reading of a 17th-century poem by Sister Juana Inés de la Cruz.

A notable video work by Cadieux was included as the inaugural piece of the 2002 The 59th Minute: Video Art on the Times Square Astrovision, an undertaking by Creative Time and Panasonic wherein the 59th minute of each hour of the day saw an artistic image in place of regular programming.  Cadieux's Portrait celebrated the regeneration and renewal of spring, featuring footage of a solitary tree, a lonely survivor of the 1998 ice storm in Montreal.

One of Cadieux's most prominent works is her 1992 piece La Voie lactée, a photograph of a woman's red lips displayed on the rooftop of the Musée d'art contemporain de Montréal. It has since become an icon of Montréal. In 2011, a sister piece, La Voix lactée, was commissioned by the Société de transport de Montréal as a gift for the Paris Metro, in exchange for the Hector Guimard Parisian metro entrance at Square-Victoria-OACI station. Based on the theme of the French language binding France and Quebec, it features a mosaic reproduction of La Voie lactée, accompanied by a poem by Anne Hébert. It was installed at Saint-Lazare station.

In 2019, her work FLOW/FLOTS was unveiled at Rideau station of the O-Train, Ottawa.

Exhibitions

Musée départemental d'art contemporain, Rochechouart, France
Museum Van Hadendaagse Kunst, Antwerp, Belgium
The Montreal Biennial, Canada, 1985, 1986, 2000
The São Paulo Biennial, Brazil, 1987
The Sydney Biennial, Australia, 1987 and 1990
The Venice Biennial, Italy, 1990
Musée d'art contemporain de Montréal, 1993
Tate Gallery, London, 1995
Pittsburgh Center for the Arts, Pittsburgh, PA, United States, 1996
Miami Art Museum, Miami, Florida, 1998
Montreal Museum of Fine Arts, 2000
The 59th Minute: Video Art on the Times Square Astrovision, New York, 2002 
 Geneviève Cadieux, Barcelone, 2003–21, National Gallery of Canada, 2021

Awards 
 1994 Victor Martyn Lynch-Staunton Award from the Canada Council.
 Royal Canadian Academy of Arts
 2011 Governor General's Awards in Visual and Media Arts.
 2014 Fellow of the Royal Society of Canada.
 2018 Prix Paul-Émile-Borduas

Notes

References
 Bélisle, Josée.  "Acquisition récente" [Geneviève Cadieux].  Journal du MACM Vol. 11, no 1 (May-Jun-Jul-Aug-Sep 2000).
 Cadieux, Geneviève.  Geneviève Cadieux.  Vancouver : Morris and Helen Belkin Art Gallery, 1999.
 Campeau, Sylvain.  "Là ou l'expérience du dessaisissement : Geneviève Cadieux". Chambres obscures. Photographie et installation.  Laval : Éditions Trois, 1995.
 "Geneviève Cadieux".  Contemporary Canadian artists.  Toronto: Gale Canada, 1997.
 Janus, Elizabeth. "Geneviève Cadieux".  Parachute.  Vol. 64 (Oct-Nov-Dec 1991).
 Pontbriand, Chantal.  "Geneviève Cadieux".  The Canadian encyclopedia [online]. Historica, 2000.  [Cited April 30, 2002].

External links
 Geneviève Cadieux– The Canadian Encyclopedia Online

1955 births
Living people
Canadian women artists
Canadian multimedia artists
Artists from Montreal
Canadian photographers
Canadian women photographers
Members of the Royal Canadian Academy of Arts
Academic staff of Concordia University
University of Ottawa alumni
Canadian contemporary artists
Governor General's Award in Visual and Media Arts winners
Feminist artists
Members of the Order of Canada
20th-century Canadian artists
21st-century Canadian artists